The Sony Xperia 5 IV is an Android smartphone manufactured by Sony. Part of Sony's Xperia series, the phone was announced on September 1, 2022.

Design
The Xperia 5 IV is built similarly to the Xperia 1 IV, using anodized aluminum for the frame and Corning Gorilla Glass Victus for the screen and back panel, as well as IP65 and IP68 certifications for water resistance. The build has a pair of symmetrical bezels on the top and the bottom, where the front-facing dual stereo speakers are placed. The right side contains a fingerprint reader embedded into the power button, a volume rocker and a shutter button. The earpiece, front-facing camera, notification LED and various sensors are housed in the top bezel. The bottom edge has the primary microphone, USB-C port, and SIM/microSDXC card slot; the rear cameras are arranged in a vertical strip. The phone is available in three colors: Black, Green and White.

Specifications

Hardware
The Xperia 5 IV is powered by the Qualcomm Snapdragon 8 Gen 1 SoC and an Adreno 730 GPU, accompanied by 8 GB of LPDDR5 RAM. It has 128 or 256 GB of UFS internal storage, which can be expanded up to 1 TB via the microSD card slot with a hybrid dual-SIM setup. The display is a 6.1-inch 1080p (2520 × 1080) HDR OLED with a 21:9 aspect ratio, resulting in a pixel density of 449 ppi. It features a 120 Hz refresh rate, and is capable of displaying one billion colors. The battery capacity is 5000 mAh; USB Power Delivery 3.0 is supported at 30W over USB-C in addition to wireless charging. The device includes a 3.5mm audio jack as well as an active external amplifier.

Camera
The Xperia 5 IV has three 12 MP rear-facing cameras and a 12 MP front-facing camera. The rear cameras consist of a wide-angle lens (24 mm f/1.7), an ultra wide angle lens (16 mm f/2.2), and a telephoto lens (60 mm f/2.4) with 2.5× optical zoom; each uses ZEISS' T✻ (T-Star) anti-reflective coating.

Software
The Xperia 5 IV runs on Android 13. Sony has also paired the phone's camera tech with a "Pro" mode developed by Sony's camera division CineAlta, whose features take after Sony's Alpha camera lineup.

References

Notes

Android (operating system) devices
Flagship smartphones
Sony smartphones
Mobile phones introduced in 2022
Mobile phones with multiple rear cameras
Mobile phones with 4K video recording